Liam Ashley was a 17-year-old boy from North Shore City, Auckland who was murdered on 24 August 2006, by George Charlie Baker, a prisoner from North Shore, Auckland. The crime occurred in a New Zealand prison van and led to criticism of the methods of transporting prisoners in New Zealand.

Background
Ian and Lorraine Ashley, Liam's parents, pressed criminal charges against their son after he used his mother's car without permission. The Ashleys denied bail so that their son would be sent to prison. They wished to correct the boy's behaviour, and prevent additional "minor misdemeanours." Liam had previously experienced "minor trouble" with New Zealand law, and his parents believed that the prison system would be the safest place for him.

Murder
The prison authorities placed Ashley in one of four compartments of a prison van operated by Chubb Security, a company operating under contract with New Zealand officials. The van was scheduled to transport the prisoners from North Shore District Court to Auckland Central Remand Prison at Mt Eden. Ashley shared the compartment with two other men, one of whom, George Baker, was classified as a dangerous criminal. Baker attacked Ashley, strangling and stomping on the boy. The victim sustained severe brain injuries. The following day, 25 August, at 10:30, his family chose to remove Ashley from life support; Liam Ashley died at 10:45.

Aftermath
Baker said that he attacked Ashley because he believed the boy was a "nark." He freely admitted to killing Ashley and received a minimum 18 year life sentence. Damien O'Connor, the Minister of Corrections, described the fatal injury as "senseless" and "preventable."

Chubb, the security company that operated the van, faced criticism in the aftermath of the attack. In June 2007 the company announced that it no longer wished to transport prisoners as contracted with New Zealand authorities.

In 2007, John Belgrave, New Zealand Chief Ombudsman, and Mel Smith, the ombudsman of the  Department of Corrections, conducted an inquiry into the department's policy for transporting prisoners. Belgrave described Corrections' prisoner transport policies as "inhumane", and ordered a review of the system. After publication of the report, Simon Power, an Opposition Justice & Corrections spokesman, asked O'Connor to resign due to the shortcomings in his department, though he stopped short of saying that O'Connor was directly responsible for Ashley's death. Power criticized the system for failing to keep Ashley, a first time offender, and Baker, a high-risk prisoner, separated.

In response to Ashley's death, New Zealand authorities began testing waist restraints for prisoners.

Following his conviction, Baker remained in the public spotlight after several further violent incidents inside Auckland Prison. In July 2008, while being returned to Auckland Prison from Auckland City Hospital after treatment for self-inflicted injuries, Baker pulled a concealed shiv on a prison officer in an attempt to escape. The prison officer received minor injuries and Baker was returned to Auckland Prison. On 27 August 2009, Baker took a fellow inmate hostage in Auckland Prison using a makeshift knife and two razor blades. Police managed to defuse the situation, and nobody was harmed in the incident. In 2010, Baker was found guilty on charges that resulted from these two incidents and was subsequently sentenced to preventive detention with no possibility of parole for at least 16 years.

See also

 Suicide of Rodney Hulin
 Death of Darren Rainey
 Death of Marcia Powell
 Death of Frank Valdes

References

External links
 . (Archive) New Zealand Department of Corrections
  (Archive). New Zealand Parliament.
 Encyclopedia of New Zealand.
 "Prisoner transport: Liam Ashley's death (1st of 2)"
 "Prisoner transport: ombudsman's investigation (2nd of 2)."

Murder in New Zealand
Murdered New Zealand children
2006 murders in New Zealand
Incidents of violence against boys
Crime in Auckland